Panaspis is a genus of skinks, commonly called lidless skinks or snake-eyed skinks, endemic to Sub-saharan Africa.

Species
The following 21 species, listed alphabetically by specific name, are recognized as being valid:

Panaspis africana (Gray, 1845) – Guinea lidless skink
Panaspis annettesabinae Colston, Pyron, & Bauer, 2020 – Sabin's snake-eyed skink
Panaspis annobonensis (Fuhn, 1972) – Annobón lidless skink
Panaspis breviceps (W. Peters, 1873) – Peters's lidless skink, short-headed snake-eyed skink
Panaspis burgeoni (de Witte, 1933)
Panaspis cabindae (Bocage, 1866) – Cabinda lidless skink, cabinda snake-eyed skink
Panaspis duruarum (Monard, 1949)
Panaspis helleri (Loveridge, 1932)
Panaspis maculicollis (Jacobsen & Broadley, 2000) – speckle-lipped snake-eyed skink, spotted-neck snake-eyed skink 
Panaspis massaiensis (Angel, 1924) – Maasai snake-eyed skink
Panaspis megalurus (Nieden, 1913) – blue-tailed snake-eyed skink, Nieden's dwarf skink
Panaspis mocamedensis Ceríaco, Heinicke, Parker, Marques, & Bauer, 2020 – Moçamedes snake-eyed skink
Panaspis namibiana Ceríaco, Branch & Bauer, 2018 – Namibian snake-eyed skink
Panaspis seydeli (de Witte, 1933) – Seydel's snake-eyed skink
Panaspis tancredii (Boulenger, 1909) – Ethiopian snake-eyed skink
Panaspis thomensis Ceríaco, Soares, Marques, Bastos-Silveira, Scheinberg, Harris, Brehm & Jesus, 2018 – São Tomé leaf-litter skink
Panaspis togoensis (F. Werner, 1902) – Togo lidless skink
Panaspis tristaoi (Monard, 1940) – Nimba snake-eyed skink
Panaspis tsavoensis Kilunda, Conradie, Wasonga, Jin, Peng, Murphy, Malonza, & Che, 2019 – Tsavo snake-eyed skink
Panaspis wahlbergii (A. Smith, 1849) – Angolan snake-eyed skink, savannah lidless skink, Wahlberg's snake-eyed skink
Panaspis wilsoni (F. Werner, 1919) – Wilson's snake-eyed skink

Nota bene: A binomial authority in parentheses indicates that the species was originally described in a genus other than Panaspis.

References

Further reading
Branch, Bill (2004). Field Guide to Snakes and other Reptiles of Southern Africa. Third revised edition, Second impression. Sanibel Island, Florida: Ralph Curtis Books Publishing. 399 pp. . (Genus Panaspis, p. 159).
Cope ED (1868). "Observations on REPTILES of the Old World. Art. II". Proc. Acad. Nat. Sci. Philadelphia 20: 316–323. (Panaspis, new genus, pp. 317–318).

 
Skinks
Lizard genera
Taxa named by Edward Drinker Cope